The National Consultative Assembly or simply Majles, was the national legislative body of Iran from 1906 to 1979.

It was elected by universal suffrage, excluding the armed forces and convicted criminals but since 1963 including women, who might both vote and be elected.

Notes and references

 Afary, Janet. The Iranian Constitutional Revolution, 1906-1911. Columbia University Press. 1996. 

National legislatures
1906 establishments in Iran
1906 in law
20th century in Iran
National Consultative Assembly
Legislature of Iran
Politics of Qajar Iran
Pahlavi Iran